Kali River may refer to:

 Kali River (Gujarat), a coastal river in Gujarat, India
 Kali River (Karnataka), a river in Karwar, Uttara Kannada, Karnataka, India
 Kali River (Uttar Pradesh), a river in Saharanpur, Muzaffarnagar and Bagpat districts of Uttar Pradesh, India
 Kali Sindh River, a river in the Malwa region of Madhya Pradesh
 Sharda River, or Kali River, a river demarcating Nepal's western border with India

See also 
 
 Kali (disambiguation)